Delano Franklyn ( – February 10, 2023) was a Jamaican attorney-at-Law, a Justice of the Peace and a Notary Public and one of the founding partners of the law firm Wilson & Franklyn.

In 1998 he was appointed the Chief Advisor to the then Prime Minister of Jamaica, P. J. Patterson. In 1999 he was appointed a Justice of the Peace and in 2000, he was one of the distinguished graduates who received the Millennium Award from the Mico Teachers College. In October 2002 he was appointed a Senator and the Minister of State in the Ministry of Foreign Affairs and Foreign Trade with special responsibility for the Jamaican Diaspora and Overseas Communities.

Franklyn was the author and editor of several books: The Right Move - Corporate Leadership and Governance in Jamaica  (2001), A Jamaican Voice in Caribbean and World Politics (2002), The Challenges of Change (2003), We Want Justice - Jamaica and the Caribbean Court of Justice (2005), Michael Manley –The Politics of Equality (2009), Sprinting into History – Jamaica and the 2008 Olympic Games (2009) and The Jamaican Diaspora: Building an Operational Framework (2010).

Franklyn died on February 10, 2023, at the age of 63.

References 

1960s births
Year of birth missing
2023 deaths
Jamaican justices of the peace
Members of the Senate of Jamaica
People's National Party (Jamaica) politicians